Bassett Creek, also known as Bassett's Creek, East Bassetts Creek and Thichapataw, is a tributary of the Tombigbee River that flows through central Clarke County in Alabama.

Bassett Creek Church and a Small community is located there today

Location

References

Rivers of Alabama
Tributaries of the Tombigbee River
Rivers of Clarke County, Alabama